The 2018 Latin American Series was the sixth edition of the Latin American Series, a baseball sporting event played by the champions of the professional winter leagues that make up the Latin American Professional Baseball Association (ALBP) and the first series containing representatives from outside the ALBP's founding nations. 

The competition took place at the Dennis Martínez National Stadium in Managua, Nicaragua from January 26 to January 31, 2018.

Qualified teams 

 Teams highlighted in red withdrew from the competition. Due to economic issues surrounding their respective leagues, both the Argentinian and Chilean representatives decided not to participate in this edition.  Leones de Montería and Caballos de Coclé boycotted the competition, with Leones withdrawing due to a dispute over missing prize money from their Latin American Series win in 2015, and Caballos after failing to come to an agreement with ALBP over salaries.  Bravos de Urracá (highlighted in green), who came second in the Panamanian Professional Baseball League, were called in as the replacement representative for Panama.

Group Phase 

|}

Semi-final

Final

Statistics leaders

References

External links 
 Official Site

Latin American Series
2018 in baseball
International baseball competitions hosted by Nicaragua
Latin American Series
Latin American Series
Sport in Managua